The Instituto de Estudios Superiores Morelos is a university in the city of Xalapa, Veracruz, Mexico.

Xalapa
Universities and colleges in Veracruz